The 134th New York State Legislature, consisting of the New York State Senate and the New York State Assembly, met from January 4 to October 6, 1911, during the first year of John Alden Dix's governorship, in Albany.

Background
Under the provisions of the New York Constitution of 1894, re-apportioned in 1906 and 1907, 51 Senators and 150 assemblymen were elected in single-seat districts; senators for a two-year term, assemblymen for a one-year term. The senatorial districts were made up of entire counties, except New York County (twelve districts), Kings County (eight districts), Erie County (three districts) and Monroe County (two districts). The Assembly districts were made up of contiguous area, all within the same county.

At this time there were two major political parties: the Republican Party and the Democratic Party. The Socialist Party, the Independence League, the Prohibition Party and the Socialist Labor Party also nominated tickets.

Elections
The New York state election, 1910, was held on November 8. John Alden Dix and Thomas F. Conway were elected Governor and Lieutenant Governor; both Democrats. Of the other seven statewide elective offices up for election, five were carried by the Democrats, and two cross-endorsed incumbent judges of the Court of Appeals were re-elected. The approximate party strength at this election, as expressed by the vote for governor, was: Democrats 690,000; Republicans 622,000; Socialists 49,000; Independence League 48,000; Prohibition 22,000; and Socialist Labor 6,000.

Sessions

The Legislature met for the regular session at the State Capitol in Albany on January 4, 1911; and adjourned on October 6.

Daniel D. Frisbie (D) was elected Speaker with 84 votes against 62 for Edwin A. Merritt, Jr. (R).

Robert F. Wagner (D) was elected president pro tempore of the State Senate.

On January 17, the Legislature began proceedings to elect a U.S. Senator from New York for a six-year term beginning on March 4, 1911.

On January 19, Governor of Minnesota Adolph Olson Eberhart addressed the members of the Assembly.

On February 6, Ex-Governor of North Carolina Robert Broadnax Glenn addressed the members of the Assembly.

On February 7, the Legislature elected Abram I. Elkus to succeed Edward Lauterbach as a Regent of the University of the State of New York, for a twelve-year term beginning on April 1, 1911.

On February 8, Daniel E. Sickles, at the time the oldest living former assemblyman (a member in 1847), addressed the members of the Assembly.

On March 9, UK Ambassador to the U.S. James Bryce addressed the members of the Senate and Assembly.

During the small hours of March 29, a fire broke out in the New York State Capitol, consuming most of the West Wing, and destroying almost completely the State Library and Archives. The Legislature moved to temporary quarters in the Albany City Hall.

On March 31, after 74 days of deadlock, the Legislature elected New York Supreme Court Justice James A. O'Gorman (D) to succeed U.S. Senator Chauncey M. Depew (R). Afterwards the Legislature took a recess of two weeks while the Capitol was being repaired.

On April 17, the Legislature met again at the State Capitol to resume the legislative business which had been delayed by the deadlocked U.S. Senate election.

On July 21, the Legislature took a recess, and met again on September 6. Clerk of the Assembly Luke McHenry had become ill, and George R. Van Namee was designated to act as Clerk. McHenry died on September 17, and Van Namee was chosen to succeed to the clerkship.

State Senate

Districts

Members
The asterisk (*) denotes members of the previous Legislature who continued in office as members of this Legislature. Felix J. Sanner, Loren H. White and J. Henry Walters changed from the Assembly to the Senate.

Employees
 Clerk: Patrick E. McCabe
 Sergeant-at-Arms: James McMahon
 Assistant Sergeant-at-Arms: August Gerritson
 Principal Doorkeeper: Fred W. Theobold
 Assistant Doorkeeper: Thomas Nolan
 Stenographer: William E. Reynolds

State Assembly
Note: For brevity, the chairmanships omit the words "...the Committee on (the)..."

Assemblymen

Employees
 Clerk: Luke McHenry, died September 17
George R. Van Namee, acting from September 6
 Sergeant-at-Arms: Lee F. Betts
 Principal Doorkeeper: Joseph Hurley, until January 24
Peter J. O'Neil, from January 24
 First Assistant Doorkeeper: Edward Bourne
 Second Assistant Doorkeeper: Edward Murphy
 Stenographer: Josiah B. Everts

Notes

Sources
 Official New York from Cleveland to Hughes by Charles Elliott Fitch (Hurd Publishing Co., New York and Buffalo, 1911, Vol. IV; see pg. 360f for assemblymen; and 367 for senators)
 Journal of the Assembly (134th Session) (1911; Vol. I, until March 29)
 Journal of the Assembly (134th Session) (1911; Vol. II, from March 29)
 DEMOCRATS CONTROL LEGISLATURE BY 29 in NYT on November 10, 1910
WAGNER IS LEADER; GRADY STAYS AWAY in NYT on January 4, 1911
 LEGISLATURE MEETS; HEARS DIX MESSAGE in NYT on January 5, 1911
 LEGISLATORS MEET IN A DAMP CAPITOL in NYT on April 18, 1911
 LEGISLATURE RESTS; PRIMARIES BILL LOST in NYT on July 22, 1911
 LEGISLATORS RIOTOUS OVER PRIMARIES BILL in NYT on October 1, 1911
 PASS PRIMARIES BILL AS LEGISLATURE ENDS in NYT on October 7, 1911

134
1911 in New York (state)
Fires at legislative buildings
1911 U.S. legislative sessions